Kharqan Rural District is a rural district (dehestan) in Bastam District, Shahrud County, Semnan Province, Iran. At the 2006 census, its population was 15,936, in 4,406 families.  The rural district has 43 villages.

Famous natives
Abu al-Hassan al-Kharaqani

References 

Rural Districts of Semnan Province
Shahrud County